Paul Martin (born 1938) is a former Canadian prime minister.

Paul Martin may also refer to:

Politics 
 Paul Martin Sr. (1903–1992), father of the above, Canadian politician
 Paul Martin (Scottish politician) (born 1967), member of the Scottish Parliament
Paul Martin (civil servant), Government of Jersey Chief Executive Officer (March 2021-22)

Science 
 Paul R. Martin (1946–2009), American psychologist, Director of Wellspring Retreat and Resource Center in Ohio
 Paul Schultz Martin (1928–2010), American geobiologist at the University of Arizona
 Paul Sidney Martin (1898–1974), American archaeologist

Sports 
 Paul Martin (athlete) (1901–1987), Swiss runner in the 1924 Summer Olympics
 Paul Martin (Australian footballer) (1964–2019), Australian rules footballer for South Adelaide
 Paul Martin (bobsleigh), German bobsledder at the 1928 Winter Olympics
 Paul Martin (ice hockey) (born 1981), American National Hockey League player
 Paul Martin (baseball) (1932–2011), American Major League Baseball player
 Paul Martin (Scottish footballer) (born 1965), Scottish association football player and coach
 Paul Martin (wrestler) (born 1949), American wrestler better known as Paul Orndorff or Mr. Wonderful
 Paul Martin (amputee athlete) (born 1967), American world-record holding Paralympian and triathlete
 Paul Martin (rugby league) (born 1967), rugby league player for Canberra Raiders
 Paul Martin (water polo) (born 1982), South African water polo coach at the 2020 Summer Olympics

Entertainment 
 Paul Martin, singer in American country band Marshall Dyllon (active 2000–2011)
 Paul Martin, a fictional character on ABC soap opera All My Children (appeared 1970–1995)
 Paul Martin (TV presenter) (born 1959), presenter of the BBC antiques programme Flog It!
 Paul Martin, real name of British comedian Paul Merton (born 1957)
 Paul Martin (radio presenter), DJ on New Zealand radio station The Rock
 Paul Martin (director) (1899–1967), Hungarian film director
 Paul Martin (Lassie), a fictional character on the long-running television series, Lassie (appeared 1957–1964)

Other 
 Paul Elliott Martin (1897–1975), American bishop of the Methodist Church
 Paul K. Martin, American lawyer and NASA Inspector General
 Paul Marius Martin (born 1940), French Latinist and historian of ancient Rome
 Paul Martin (illustrator) (1883–1932), American cover artist for Collier's magazine
 Paul Martin (Irish journalist) (born 1977), Irish journalist
 Paul Martin (bishop) (born 1967), New Zealand Roman Catholic bishop
 Paul Martin (photographer) (1864–1944), French-born British photographer

See also 
 Paul-Martin Gallocher de Lagalisserie (1805–1871), French engineer